Jerry Colonna may refer to:

 Jerry Colonna (entertainer), American comedy writer and performer
 Jerry Colonna (financier), New York City venture capitalist